Necmi Sönmez (born 1968 in Istanbul, Turkey) is a Turkish-German curator, art critic and writer. He lives and works in Düsseldorf.

Life and work

Necmi Sönmez studied art history, Byzantine art history and classical archaeology in Mainz, Paris, Newcastle and Frankfurt am Main. He gained his doctorate in 2001 in Frankfurt with a dissertation on “Milch, Blütenstaub, Reis und Wachs. Das Gesamtwerk von Wolfgang Laib” (Milk, pollen, rice and wax. The artistic oeuvre of Wolfgang Laib) at Goethe University Frankfurt with Prof. Stefan Germer and Prof. Manfred Schneckenburger .
 
From 1994 to 1997, Sönmez worked as an independent curator, initiating and organizing numerous exhibition projects, mainly involving young artists, in Turkey, Germany, the Netherlands and France. From 1998 to 2000 he was a project assistant at the Museum Wiesbaden and at the MUMOK (Museum Moderner Kunst Stiftung Ludwig) in Vienna.

Exhibitions
From 2001 until the end of January 2005, Sönmez held the post of curator of contemporary art at the Museum Folkwang in Essen, where he curated several exhibitions and projects, including the first museum exhibitions of artists, such as Didiert Trenet (2001), Daniel Knorr (2001), Surasi Kusolwong (2002), Elisabeth Ballet (2003) and Saâdane Hafif (2005). 

From 2006 to 2008, Sönmez was artistic director of the Kunstverein Arnsberg, where he presented artists such as Ekrem Yalcindag, Gregor Schneider (both 2006), Myriam Holme, Florian Bach (both 2007), Sabine Boehl, Martin Dammann and Anja Cuipka (all 2008). 

His current activities include co-curating the exhibition “Contemporary Art from Islamic Cultures” Kunstmuseum Bochum, serving as a member of the committee of experts (Comité Technique) of the Regional Contemporary Art Fund (FRAC) in the French region of Franche-Comté and working as guest curator for the Proje4L / Elgiz Museum of Contemporary Art in Istanbul.

Public projects

Necmi Sönmez has changed the structure of Städtische Galerie Museum Folkwang to the Mobile Städtische Galerie from 2001 until 2005. He has developed an interdisciplinary subversive public art program aimed at forging closer links between theoretical formats and exhibition presentations.

 2001 “Tische der Kommunikation” (Table of Communication)
 2002 “Private Öffentlichkeit” (Private Public)
 2003 “Sukûn / Stille” (Silence, 2003)
 2004 “Das Erinnerte Haus” (The remembered house, 2004)

Books

Since 1994, Necmi Sönmez has published number of monographies on artists that function in parallel to his curatorial work including:

 Fahr-el-Nissa Zeid (Aksoy Foundation, Istanbul, 1994)
 Mübin Orhan Robert and Lisa Sainbury Collection (Yapi Kredi Yayinlari, Istanbul, 1996) 
 „Ecole de Paris et les Peintres Turc“ (Yapi Kredi Yayinlari, Istanbul, 2000)
 Klaus Jürgen-Fischer, "Kunstspektakel -  Kunstdebakel. Kunstkritisches Tagebuch, (Salon Verlag, Cologne, 2001)
 Sanat Hayati Icerir mi?: Selected Writings 1995–2005 (Yapi Kredi Yayinlari, Istanbul, 2006)
 Turkish Realities, Positions of Contemporary Photography from Turkey, (Kerber Verlag, Heidelberg, 2008)

Critical writing

Necmi Sönmez has contributed to Flash Art, Neue Bildende Kunst, Kunstzeitung, Cumhuriyet and Virgül.

See also

 Turkish art
 Public art
 Curator

Notes and references

External links
 http://www.necmisoenmez.de
 http://www.art-magazin.de/kunst/15236/radar
 http://www.goethe.de/kue/bku/kur/kur/sz/son/enindex.htm

German people of Turkish descent
German art curators
Turkish art curators
German art critics
1968 births
Living people